The Vanuatu Cultural Centre (in Bislama Vanuatu Kaljoral Senta or "VKS"; in French Centre Culturel du Vanuatu), founded in 1955, is the national cultural institution of Vanuatu. It is located in the capital Port Vila.

From 1995 to 2006, the VKS was run by Ralph Regenvanu. From 2007 until his termination in November 2014, Abong Marcelin was director. Ambong Thompson is currently acting Director.

The institution
Describing itself as "an organisation that works to record and promote the diverse cultures" of Vanuatu, the Vanuatu Cultural Centre fulfills the role a national body for the preservation, the protection and the promotion of the different aspects of the culture of the archipelago. The Vanuatu Cultural Centre is an umbrella organization which includes :
 The National Museum of Vanuatu
 The National Film and Sound Unit
 The Vanuatu Cultural and Historical Site Survey
 The National Archives
 The National Library
 The Public Library
 The Fieldworkers's Unit
 The Tafea Cultural Centre (Lenakel, Tanna)
 The Malekula Cultural Centre
 VKS E-Press
Its aim is to record and promote the traditional indigenous cultures of Vanuatu in their various aspects - from sand drawing to music, land diving, other "customary practices" and "indigenous knowledge"-, but also the country's "contemporary arts and music".

Among its projects is the Oral Traditions Collection Project, started in 1976, which has been described as "without doubt, the Pacific's most successful grassroots cultural documentation program".

The Centre produces radio programmes and videos aimed at cultural promotion, preservation or revival. As of 1996, the centre's collection contained "approximately 2500 hours of audio tape, 2300 hours of video tape, twenty-three hours of 16-millimetre film footage, thirty hours of 8-millimetre film footage, 3000 early (up to 1950s) black-and-white photographs, and around 4000 colour slides, colour negatives and black-and-white negatives". Access to some of this material is restricted, being tabu. Some material may be accessed only by men, some only by women, and some only by members of particular indigenous cultural groups.

See also
 Culture of Vanuatu
 Roy Mata Domain
 Sand drawing
 Pacific Islands Museums Association

References

External links
 Official website 
 Hochet, Antoine, 2013, Coopération et développement  : le cas du Centre Culturel du Vanuatu, VKS Productions / Pacifique Dialogues, Port-Vila, Vanuatu, . 

National museums
Port Vila
Museums in Vanuatu
Museums established in 1955
1955 establishments in the New Hebrides